Winton is a civil parish in the Eden District, Cumbria, England.  It contains twelve listed buildings that are recorded in the National Heritage List for England.  Of these, one is listed at Grade II*, the middle of the three grades, and the others are at Grade II, the lowest grade.  The parish includes the village of Winton, and is otherwise rural.  The listed buildings consist of houses and associated structures, farmhouses and farm buildings, and a pinfold, a boundary stone, and a former school.


Key

Buildings

References

Citations

Sources

Lists of listed buildings in Cumbria